"Amanda"' is a song recorded by Australian actor/musician Craig McLachlan and band 'Check 1–2'. It was their third single from the album, Craig McLachlan & Check 1-2. It was a commercial success peaking at No. 24 in Australia and No. 19 in the UK.

Track listing

Charts

Credits
 Backing vocals – John Hinde, Lindsay Field, Lisa Edwards, Nikki Nicholls
 Bass – Mark Beckhouse
 Drums – Mark Meyer 
 Keyboards – Garth Porter, Chong Lim
 Percussion – John Clark

References

1990 singles
CBS Records singles
1990 songs
Craig McLachlan songs